Irish Mist is an Irish whiskey-based liqueur produced in Tullamore, Ireland, by the Irish Mist Liqueur Company Ltd. In September 2010 it was announced that the brand was being bought by Gruppo Campari from William Grant, only a few months after Grants had bought it from the C&C Group. It is made from aged Irish whiskey, heather and clover honey, aromatic herbs, and other spirits, blended to an ancient recipe claimed to be 1,000 years old. Though it was once 80 US proof (40% alcohol per volume), Irish Mist is now 35% or 70 US proof. The bottle shape has also been changed from a "decanter" style to a more traditional whiskey bottle shape. It is currently available in more than 40 countries.

History
Irish Mist was the first liqueur to be produced in Ireland when commercial production began in 1947 at Tullamore, County Offaly. Tullamore is the hometown of the Williams family who were the original owners of Irish Mist. The company history goes back to 1829 when the Tullamore Distillery was founded to produce Irish whiskey. In the mid-1940s Desmond E. Williams began the search for an alternative yet related product, eventually deciding to produce a liqueur based on the ancient beverage known as heather wine.

In 1985 the Cantrell & Cochrane Group purchased the Irish Mist Liqueur Company from the Williams family. In the summer of 2010 Irish Mist and the entire spirit division of C&C was bought by William Grant of Scotland. In September 2010 they in turn sold Irish Mist to Gruppo Campari.

Recipes
Irish Mist is typically served straight up or on ice, but also goes with coffee, vodka, or cranberry juice. Per the makers, Irish Mist's most popular recipe is Irish Mist with Cola and Lime. A Rusty Mist is an ounce of Irish Mist with an ounce of Drambuie Scotch whisky liqueur. 

A Black Nail is made from equal parts Irish Mist and Irish whiskey.

References

External links
 Official website 

Honey liqueurs and spirits
Herbal liqueurs
Irish liqueurs
Campari Group